Scholly is an American scholarship web and app search platform developed by Christopher Gray. The platform makes custom recommendations for postsecondary scholarships by matching students to the scholarships they personally qualify for. It uses a variety of parameters (such as gender, state, GPA, race, etc.) to filter and deliver a targeted list of appropriate scholarships along with links and deadlines.

With one million users, the project has landed Gray on Forbes’ 2016 30 Under 30 list of social entrepreneurs.

History

Founding 
The company was founded by Christopher Gray, a former student from Ramsay High School in Birmingham, Alabama. The eldest of three siblings raised by a single mother, his mother had just lost her job at a call center in the 2008 recession. As the first child in his family to go to college, Gray searched for scholarships online as a way to pay for his fees and tuition.

He received his first grant, Horatio Alger scholarship, for $20,000. “I stepped out of class to take the call. I ran back in and gave my teacher a big hug. That was the moment college became a reality for me.” Gray amassed $1.3 million in scholarships. He chose Drexel University in Philadelphia, where he majored in business administration, stating "I’m covered until my PhD." He founded Scholly with web developers Nick Pirollo and Bryson Alef.

Growth 
Gray appeared in ABC’s Shark Tank, where entrepreneurs try to convince a panel of financiers (Mark Cuban, Daymond John, Kevin O'Leary, Lori Greiner, Robert Herjavec) to invest in their business. Gray secured $40,000 in capital from Greiner and John, which sparked an intense disagreement with the other three after Gray exited the room.

Within hours after the episode aired, the Scholly site received 80,000 requests in a few hours. Since December 2016, 850,000 users have downloaded the app, connecting students with $50 million in scholarships.

Gray has met with Bill Gates, been honored by Oprah Winfrey and invited twice to the White House. Steve Case, the AOL co-founder and former CEO, awarded a $100,000 competitive grant to Scholly. He also teamed with Grey’s Anatomy star Jesse Williams.

References 

Scholarships in the United States
Scholarships
Student loans in the United States